The RSL Christopher Bland Prize was inaugurated by the Royal Society of Literature to encourage the work of older writers. It is awarded annually to an author of a fiction or non-fiction book who was first published when aged 50 or over. The prize is valued at £10,000 and was launched in September 2018. It is named in recognition of Sir Christopher Bland, who was 76 when his first novel was published.

The initial panel of judges was chaired by Gillian Slovo, and comprised Sanjeev Bhaskar, Archie Bland (son of Sir Christopher) and Anne Chisholm.

Winners

Shortlists

References

External links 
 Official website

Royal Society of Literature awards
Awards established in 2018
British fiction awards
British non-fiction literary awards